In probability theory, statistics, and machine learning, the continuous Bernoulli distribution is a family of continuous probability distributions  parameterized by a single shape parameter , defined on the unit interval , by:

The continuous Bernoulli distribution arises in deep learning and computer vision, specifically in the context of variational autoencoders, for modeling the pixel intensities of natural images. As such, it defines a proper probabilistic counterpart for the commonly used binary cross entropy loss, which is often applied to continuous, -valued data. This practice amounts to ignoring the normalizing constant of the continuous Bernoulli distribution, since the binary cross entropy loss only defines a true log-likelihood for discrete, -valued data.

The continuous Bernoulli also defines an exponential family of distributions. Writing  for the natural parameter, the density can be rewritten in canonical form:
.

Related distributions

Bernoulli distribution 
The continuous Bernoulli can be thought of as a continuous relaxation of the Bernoulli distribution, which is defined on the discrete set  by the probability mass function:

where  is a scalar parameter between 0 and 1. Applying this same functional form on the continuous interval  results in the continuous Bernoulli probability density function, up to a normalizing constant.

Beta distribution 
The Beta distribution has the density function:

which can be re-written as:

where  are positive scalar parameters, and  represents an arbitrary point inside the 1-simplex, . Switching the role of the parameter and the argument in this density function, we obtain:

This family is only identifiable up to the linear constraint , whence we obtain:

corresponding exactly to the continuous Bernoulli density.

Exponential distribution 
An exponential distribution restricted to the unit interval is equivalent to a continuous Bernoulli distribution with appropriate parameter.

Continuous categorical distribution 
The multivariate generalization of the continuous Bernoulli is called the continuous-categorical.

References 

Continuous distributions
Exponential family distributions